National Route 480 is a national highway of Japan. The highway connects Izumi, Osaka and Arida, Wakayama.

References

480
Former toll roads in Japan
Roads in Osaka Prefecture
Roads in Wakayama Prefecture